Qianjiang New City or Hangzhou CBD is a central business district situated in the west bank of Qiantang River in Hangzhou, Zhejiang Province, China. Construction work of this district began in 2007, being a significant part of Hangzhou's resolution of expansion from "West-Lake-centered era" to "Qiantang-River-centered era". It is currently one of two central business districts and the financial district of Hangzhou city.

Iconic architecture in the district includes the golden-egg-structured International Conference Center, moon-shaped Hangzhou Grand Theater, and the City Balcony and Raffles City shopping mall. Hangzhou municipal government moved from city center to Qianjiang New City in 2016.

Line 1, Line 2, Line 4, Line 7 and Line 9 of Hangzhou Metro are currently serving the area.

References

Geography of Hangzhou
Economy of Hangzhou
Central business districts in China